The twenty-third series of the British reality television programme The Only Way Is Essex began airing on 2 September 2018 with an Italian special as the cast flew off to Sardinia. The series was confirmed on 21 December 2017, when it was announced that a further two series had been commissioned for 2018.

Ahead of the series, it was announced that James "Arg" Argent would be taking a break from the show after recently returning to rehab, however he never returned to the series. New cast members for this series include Saffron Lempriere, and Sam Mucklow, who is the brother of former cast member Billi Mucklow. Former Love Island contestant Kady McDermott also made her debut during this series, as well as Demi Sims, the sister of Chloe Sims. This series heavily focused on the feud between Myles and Courtney as he introduces his new girlfriend Kady to the group. It also included Lockie and Yaz's relationship hit a number of obstacles once again before both agreeing to have counselling, as well as the end of the line for Pete and Shelby. Following this series it was announced that this would be the first year without a Christmas special since the show began in 2010.

Cast

Episodes

{| class="wikitable plainrowheaders" style="width:100%; background:#fff;"
! style="background:#C1C1C1;"| Seriesno.
! style="background:#C1C1C1;"| Episodeno.
! style="background:#C1C1C1;"| Title
! style="background:#C1C1C1;"| Original air date
! style="background:#C1C1C1;"| Duration
! style="background:#C1C1C1;"| UK viewers

|}

Reception

Ratings
For the first time, catch-up service totals were added to the official ratings.

References

The Only Way Is Essex
2018 British television seasons